"Horehronie" is a Slovak pop song, composed by Martin Kavulič with lyrics by poet Kamil Peteraj and performed by Kristina, and it was the Slovak entry at the Eurovision Song Contest 2010. It was performed together with a backing vocals Hana servická and dancers: Martin Mikulášek, Peter Živner, David Schimmer & Slavomír Kolkovič. The song is an ode to the Horehronie tourism region. It became the winner of the Slovak music contest Eurosong 2010 on 27 February, getting the largest share of the televote and coming second in the jury vote.

The song failed to qualify to the Eurovision Song Contest 2010 final from first semifinal on 25 May, reaching 16th place out of 17. However, many people look back to it as one of Slovakia's best entries.

Track listing
Versions of the track were released as a CD single.

Covers 
Reggae band from New Zealand, Cornerstone Roots, made a cover of Horehronie in 2010. The band played this song together with Slovak reggae group Medial Banana on Uprising Reggae Festival in Slovakia that year.

Charts

References

External links
Official music video - YouTube

2010 singles
2010 songs
Eurovision songs of 2010
Eurovision songs of Slovakia
Songs written by Kamil Peteraj
Slovak-language songs